Justamustache is the 2005 album released by Detroit-based post-punk revival band, Thunderbirds Are Now! The album was released by Frenchkiss Records.

Track listing
"Better Safe Than Safari" – 2:36
"Eat This City" – 2:47
"198090" – 3:44
"Aquatic Cupid's Harpoons of Love" – 2:57
"Enough About Me, Let's Talk About Me" – 3:21
"To: Skulls" – 3:15
"From: Skulls" – 4:19
"Bodies Adjust" – 3:25
"This World Is Made of Paper" – 3:33
"Cobra Feet" – 4:02

Personnel
 Martin Smith – bass, cowbell
 Ryan Allen – guitars, vocals, live drums & piano on "Bodies Adjust"
 Michael Durgan – snare, cymbals, bass drum, toms
 Scott Allen – keyboards, sequencer, samples, vocals, percussion
 Shannon McCarthy– singers on "Eat This City" / Vocalist and writer of opening and closing tracks
 Dave Feeny - Producer, Engineer, Mixing

References

External links
Thunderbirds are Now! official site
Frenchkiss Records

2005 albums
Thunderbirds Are Now! albums